Petrohrad is a municipality and village in Louny District in the Ústí nad Labem Region of the Czech Republic. It has about 600 inhabitants.

Administrative parts
Villages of Bílenec and Černčice are administrative parts of Petrohrad.

References

Villages in Louny District